Enyo latipennis is a species of moth in the family Sphingidae. It was described by Rothschild and Jordan, in 1903. It is known from Jamaica.

There are probably two or three generations per year.

References

Enyo (moth)
Moths described in 1903